Menegazzia cincinnata is a species of foliose lichen from southern South America. It was first scientifically described by Swedish lichenologist Erik Acharius as Parmelia cincinnata. Friedrich August Georg Bitter transferred it to the genus Menegazzia in 1901.

Menegazzia cincinnata is quite similar in morphology to Menegazzia valdiviensis, but the two species can be distinguished from each other by a combination of ascospore length and the presence or absence of thamnolic acid in the medulla.

See also
List of Menegazzia species

References

cincinnata
Lichen species
Lichens described in 1901
Lichens of southern South America
Taxa named by August von Krempelhuber